Bielsko Synagogue was a synagogue in Bielsko, Poland. It was built in 1879–1881, designed by Karol Korn. The synagogue was completely destroyed by Nazis on 13 September 1939.

 

Buildings and structures in Bielsko-Biała
Cieszyn Silesia
Former synagogues in Poland
19th-century synagogues
Modern Orthodox Judaism in Europe
Moorish Revival synagogues
Romanesque Revival synagogues
Holocaust locations in Poland
Synagogues in Poland destroyed by Nazi Germany
Modern Orthodox synagogues
Orthodox synagogues in Poland
19th-century religious buildings and structures in Poland
Synagogues completed in 1881